Jason Cameron (born April 19, 1969) is an American television presenter and actor most notable for his role on the TLC reality show, While You Were Out and is currently hosting Man Caves and Desperate Landscapes for the DIY Network.

Career

Acting & modelling
In 1999, Cameron moved to New York City to pursue an acting career. He landed a few minor roles to date including on Sex and the City, The Guiding Light and All My Children. At the same time, he became a print model appearing in Men’s Health, Men’s Fitness, Maxim and GQ.

Hosting & carpentry
Cameron has developed a passion for carpentry and construction at a young age, and worked as a construction worker after college to make ends meet. In 2003, he auditioned as an on-screen carpenter for the TLC renovation program, While You Were Out. He got the job and joined the cast in season two, staying on until the end of the show's run in 2006.

After the show's end, Cameron became a licensed contractor and was approached by DIY Network to host their landscape makeover show Desperate Landscapes in 2007. Since then, he has also been hosting Man Caves and Project Xtreme for the network.

Fitness
Cameron is a certified personal trainer, specializing in strength and conditioning. He has competed in numerous bodybuilding competitions and has worked as a fitness model, appearing in Men's Health, Men’s Fitness and Muscle Media. He is currently a representative and the Fitness Expert for Men’s Fitness.

Personal life
Cameron was born in Toledo, Ohio, the middle child of three boys. He graduated from Republic-Michigamme High School in Republic, Michigan in 1988, and holds a bachelor's degree from the Northern Michigan University in criminal justice.  He met his wife Maryanne while pursuing an acting career in New York in 1999.
His amateur hobbies include mountain biking, hiking, volleyball, and softball.

Filmography

References

External links

Living people
American television personalities
1969 births
American male television actors
Male models from Ohio
American exercise instructors
American carpenters
Writers from Ohio
Sportspeople from Toledo, Ohio
Northern Michigan University alumni
Male actors from Toledo, Ohio